Grigol Tsaava (born 5 January 1962) is a Georgian former footballer.

References

External links

Soviet footballers
Footballers from Georgia (country)
Association football wingers
FC Dinamo Tbilisi players
Soviet Top League players
Sportspeople from Sukhumi
Living people
1962 births